Charles Erskine may refer to:

 Charles Erskine, Earl of Mar (1650–1689), Scottish nobleman
 Charles Erskine, Lord Tinwald (1680–1763), Scottish judge, Lord Advocate, MP for Dumfriesshire 1722–41 and for Tain Burghs 1734–42
 Charles Erskine (1716–1749), his son, Scottish lawyer, MP for Ayr Burghs
 Charles Erskine (cardinal) (1739–1811), Italian-Scottish papal diplomat and cardinal
 Sir Charles Erskine, 1st Baronet, of Alva (1643–1690), Scottish politician